The Governor of Catamarca is a citizen of Catamarca Province, Argentina, holding the office of governor for the corresponding period. The governor is elected alongside a vice-governor. Currently the governor of Catamarca is Raúl Jalil.

Governors since 1983

See also
 Legislature of Catamarca
 Senate of Catamarca
 Chamber of Deputies of Catamarca

References